Henry Sallows Walsh was an Australian politician and businessman.

Walsh was born  in Lewes, Sussex, and arrived at the then Colony of Victoria in 1849.

Walsh was elected as member of the City of Melbourne council on 1 November 1858.

Walsh was the Mayor of Melbourne from 1858 to 1859.

Walsh died on 8 July 1877 in Hawthorn, Victoria.

References

1804 births
1877 deaths
Mayors and Lord Mayors of Melbourne
English emigrants to colonial Australia
Members of the Victorian Legislative Council
19th-century Australian politicians
People from Lewes